Gilbert Swinburne Glidden (15 December 1915 – October 1988) was an English footballer who played for Sunderland, Port Vale, Reading, and Leyton Orient.

Career
Glidden was signed to Sunderland, before joining Port Vale in May 1935. He played five Second Division games and one FA Cup game in the 1935–36 season, and scored one goal in a 2–1 win over Bradford City at The Old Recreation Ground on 18 January. The "Valiants" were relegated, and Glidden moved on to Reading. The "Royals" competed in the Third Division South, finishing fifth in 1936–37, sixth in 1937–38, and fifth in 1938–39. He scored 24 goals in 111 league appearances at Elm Park. He guested for Tranmere Rovers, Aldershot, Crewe Alexandra, Everton and Manchester United during World War II. He played one game for Leyton Orient after the war.

Career statistics
Source:

References

1915 births
1988 deaths
Footballers from Sunderland
English footballers
Association football forwards
Association football fullbacks
Sunderland A.F.C. players
Port Vale F.C. players
Reading F.C. players
Tranmere Rovers F.C. wartime guest players
Aldershot F.C. wartime guest players
Crewe Alexandra F.C. wartime guest players
Everton F.C. wartime guest players
Manchester United F.C. wartime guest players
Leyton Orient F.C. players
English Football League players